Isaac Witman Huntzberger (March 26, 1873 – September 14, 1927) was an American football player and coach. He served as a player-coach at Lebanon Valley College in Annville, Pennsylvania in 1897.

References

1873 births
1927 deaths
19th-century players of American football
Player-coaches
Lebanon Valley Flying Dutchmen football coaches
Lebanon Valley Flying Dutchmen football players
People from Elizabethtown, Pennsylvania
Players of American football from Pennsylvania